Steel Mill is the debut studio album by the American grunge band Willard.

Track listing 
All music and lyrics by Willard, except for "Folsom" written by Johnny Cash.
"Fifteen" – 4:48
"Seasick" – 4:02
"Sweet Kali" – 4:39
"No Confession" – 3:15
"Steel Mill" – 5:08
"Monotony" – 3:24
"Stain" – 3:50
"High Moon" – 5:25
"Hod" – 4:09
"Double Dragon" – 4:00
"Folsom" – 3:55
"Water Sports" – 4:21

Personnel 
Johnny Clint – vocals
Otis P. Otis – guitar
Darren Peters – bass
Mark Spiders – guitar
Steve Wied – drums, percussion
Tad Doyle – background vocals

Additional Personnel
Jack Endino – engineer, mixing, producer
Alison Braun – art direction, photography
Monte Conner – A&R

External links 
 Steel Mill at AllMusic
 Steel Mill at Discogs

Willard (band) albums
Albums produced by Jack Endino
Roadrunner Records albums
1992 debut albums